Mutaalim Khalilovich Magomedov (born 21 April 2000) is a Russian football player. He plays for FC Tver.

Club career
He made his debut in the Russian Football National League for FC SKA-Khabarovsk on 17 July 2021 in a game against FC Neftekhimik Nizhnekamsk.

References

External links
 
 Profile by Russian Football National League

2000 births
Living people
Russian footballers
Association football midfielders
FC Anzhi Makhachkala players
FC SKA-Khabarovsk players
FC Dynamo Bryansk players
Russian Second League players
Russian First League players